Wayne Roberts may refer to:

 Wayne Roberts (activist) (1944–2021), Canadian journalist, activist, food policy analyst
 Wayne Roberts (artist) (1950–2012), American graffiti artist better known as Stay High 149
 Wayne Roberts (soccer) (born 1977), South African football (soccer) player
 Wayne Roberts, master bike frame builder for Ciombola